The Swiss Seniors Open is the Swiss stop on men's professional golf's European Senior Tour. It was founded in 1997 as the Credit Suisse Private Banking Seniors Open and from 1999 to 2014 was known as the Bad Ragaz PGA Seniors Open. It is played at Bad Ragaz Golf Club. In 2019 the prize fund was €320,000.

Winners

Notes

External links
Coverage on the European Senior Tour's official site

European Senior Tour events
Golf tournaments in Switzerland
Bad Ragaz
Recurring sporting events established in 1997
1997 establishments in Switzerland